Svetlana Nikolayevna Frantsuzova (1963 – May 4, 2022) was a competitive figure skater who represented the Soviet Union. As a single skater, she was the 1980 Prize of Moscow News champion and 1981 Winter Universiade silver medalist. She later switched to pair skating with Oleg Gorshkov. The two won bronze at the 1985 Winter Universiade and silver at the 1985 Prague Skate. She was the mother of Russian figure skater Gordei Gorshkov.

Competitive highlights

Pairs with Gorshkov

Ladies' singles

References 

1963 births
2022 deaths
Soviet female pair skaters
Soviet female single skaters
Figure skaters from Saint Petersburg
Universiade medalists in figure skating
Universiade bronze medalists for the Soviet Union
Competitors at the 1985 Winter Universiade